Sitaramam is an Indian Malayalam language family drama television series, starring Snisha Chandran and Vivek Gopan. It premiered on Surya TV on 13 March 2023, and airs on daily and is available for streaming in selected markets on Sun NXT. The show is an official remake of Tamil television series Sevvanthi which is being aired on Sun TV.

Cast

Adaptations

References

Indian television soap operas
Malayalam-language television shows
2023 Indian television series debuts
Surya TV original programming
Malayalam-language television series based on Tamil-language television series